Se Armo la Moña en Carnaval (The Party is Started in Carnival) is the twenty first studio album by Colombian musician singer-songwriter Joe Arroyo, released by Discos Fuentes on May 10, 2005. The album is innovative for Arroyo's music, because the song "Reggaeson Son Son" is a Reggaeton and alludes to the Carnival of Barranquilla.

Track listing

References 

Joe Arroyo albums
Discos Fuentes albums
2005 albums